Egocentric predicament, a term coined by Ralph Barton Perry in an article (Journal of Philosophy 1910), is the problem of not being able to view reality outside of our own perceptions. All worldly knowledge takes the form of mental representations that our mind examines in different ways. Direct contact with reality cannot be made outside of our own minds; therefore, we cannot be sure reality even exists. This means that we are each limited to our own perceptual world and views. Solipsism is an extension of this which assumes that only one's own mind is sure to exist.

Since 1710, when George Berkeley broached in his fashion the problem of the egocentric predicament, denying the existence of material substance except as ideas in the minds of perceivers, and thus asserting a problematical relation with reality, hence has this thesis proved a stumbling block.

Samuel Johnson is well known for his "refutation" of Bishop Berkeley's immaterialism, his claim that matter did not actually exist but only seemed to exist: during a conversation with Boswell, Johnson powerfully stomped a nearby stone and proclaimed of Berkeley's theory, "I refute it thus!"

Both Perry's concept and the term he used influenced American philosopher, Everett W. Hall to create the solecism "the categorio-centric predicament" to express the impossibility of seeing the world outside the "categories" imposed by one's native language and conceptual scheme.

See also 
 Cartesian doubt
 External world skepticism
 Internal realism
 Phaneron
 Relativism

Notes

Works cited

Further reading
 George Berkeley author, philosophical work A Treatise Concerning the Principles of Human Knowledge in 1710
 Doctor Johnson, Berkeley's near contemporary
 Annotated Bibliography of the Writings of William James : philosophical work - author Ralph Barton Perry

Epistemology